Shirbacheh Pir (also Romanized as Shīrbacheh Pīr; also known as Shīrvacheh Pīr) is a village in Khoshabar Rural District, in the Central District of Rezvanshahr County, Gilan Province, Iran. At the 2006 census, its population was 75, in 19 families.

References 

Populated places in Rezvanshahr County